Nu Thang is the second studio album from DC Talk, which was released in 1990. It was certified Gold by RIAA. Almost two decades later, the single "Nu Thang" and its YouTube video gained more recognition after a viral video was put up known as "The Nu Thang Kid". It is a video of a boy from the 1990s rapping "Nu Thang", and the video was used on an episode of Equals Three.

Track listing
"When DC Talks"  – 2:28
"He Works"  – 3:39
"I Luv Rap Music"  – 3:49
"No More"  – 3:37
"Nu Thang"  – 4:12
"Things of This World"  – 5:11
"Walls"  – 4:10
"Talk It Out"  – 3:59
"Take It to the Lord"  – 4:20
"Children Can Live (Without It)"  – 3:56
"Can I Get a Witness"  – 4:25

Singles
"I Luv Rap Music"
"Can I Get A Witness"

Music videos
"I Luv Rap Music"
"Nu Thang"
"Walls"

Personnel 

DC Talk
 Toby McKeehan – lead and backing vocals, rap, drum programming, samples, scratches
 Kevin Max Smith – lead and backing vocals, keyboards
 Michael Tait – lead and backing vocals

Musicians

 Mark Heimermann – keyboards, backing vocals 
 Tony Thomas – keyboards
 Jerry McPherson – guitar
 Greg Redding – guitar
 Chris Rodriguez – guitar, backing vocals
 Steve Taylor – guitar
 Jackie Street – bass
 Joel Dobbins – drum programming 
 Joe Hogue – drum programming, backing vocals
 Tom Lonardo – drum programming
 Gary Lunn – drum programming
 Todd Collins – backing vocals, samples, scratches
 Vicki Hampton – backing vocals
 Chris Harris – backing vocals
 Chris Hogue – backing vocals
 Lisa Rodriguez – backing vocals

Production

 Mark Heimermann – producer
 Toby McKeehan – producer
 Dan Brock – executive producer
 Ron W. Griffin – executive producer
 Chris Harris – executive producer 
 Joe Baldridge – engineer
 Lynn Fuston – engineer
 Rusty McFarland – engineer
 Greg Morrow – engineer
 Randy Garmon – assistant engineer 
 Ray Gaston – assistant engineer
 Gregg Jampol – assistant engineer
 Bret Teegarden – mixing
 Ken Love – mastering
 Buddy Jackson – art direction
 Beth Middleworth – design
 Mark Tucker – photography

References

DC Talk albums
1990 albums
ForeFront Records albums